Prosiek is a village and municipality in Liptovský Mikuláš District in the Žilina Region of northern Slovakia.

History
In historical records the village was first mentioned in 1280.

Geography
The municipality lies at an altitude of 600 metres and covers an area of 12.674 km². It has a population of about 192 people.

External links
http://www.statistics.sk/mosmis/eng/run.html

Villages and municipalities in Liptovský Mikuláš District